ZGF Architects LLP (ZGF), formerly Zimmer Gunsul Frasca Partnership, is an American architectural firm founded in 1942, and based in Portland, Oregon, with seven offices in the United States and Canada.

History
The company was founded in 1942 in Portland.  In July 2009, the company moved into a new headquarters on Southwest 12th Avenue and Washington Street in downtown Portland, from Southwest Third and Oak.

Operations
, ZGF has offices in Seattle, Los Angeles, Washington DC, New York City, and Denver in addition to the headquarters in Portland. The Portland headquarters, the largest architecture firm in Portland, is the largest of the offices, employing about 280 people. Since 2013, the firm's managing partner has been Ted Hyman.

Example of works
Southport (Renton, Washington)
Yeon Building, Gresham, Oregon

References

External links
Official website

1942 establishments in Oregon
Architects of Latter Day Saint religious buildings and structures
Architecture firms based in Oregon
Companies based in Portland, Oregon
Design companies established in 1942
Privately held companies based in Oregon